"", sometimes known simply as "" ("Perhaps"), is a popular song by Cuban songwriter Osvaldo Farrés. Farrés wrote the music and original Spanish lyrics for the song which became a hit for Bobby Capó in 1947.

English version
The English lyrics for "Perhaps, Perhaps, Perhaps" were translated by Joe Davis from the original Spanish version. The English version was first recorded by Desi Arnaz in 1948 (RCA).

French version
The story is about a man wondering if the flirting of his girlfriend while dancing with an unknown man will have impact on their relationship: "Who knows?". It has been first recorded by Luis Mariano in 1948, on a single for His Master's Voice.

Notable cover versions
Notable cover versions include:
1951: Bing Crosby recorded the song with the Bando da Lua on February 5, 1951, for Decca Records.
1958: Nat King Cole regularly performed the song with a heavy American accent. His version appeared on his 1958 album Cole Español and frequently appeared in the 2000 film In the Mood for Love.
1960: Los Panchos recorded a version with Johnny Albino.
1964: Celia Cruz
1965: Doris Day recorded the English version of the song, released on her album Latin for Lovers. This cover was later used in the 1992 movie Strictly Ballroom.
1996: CAKE (band) "Perhaps Perhaps Perhaps"
2000: Mari Wilson sang it for the titles of the television series Coupling.
2013: Andrea Bocelli released a version with Jennifer Lopez.
2022: Arthur Hanlon with Debi Nova

References

External links
 

1947 songs
Cuban songs
Celia Cruz songs
Spanish-language songs
Comedy television theme songs
Jazz standards
Jazz compositions